Daniel (Dani) Rosenoer (born December 21, 1984) is a Russian-born Canadian singer-songwriter and pianist. He has toured with the Canadian rock band Three Days Grace, as their keyboard player and backup vocalist from 2012 to 2018. He has also released several independent albums and EPs.

Early life 
Dani Rosenoer was born on December 21, 1984 in Moscow, grew up in Jerusalem, Israel and later immigrated with his family to Toronto, Canada at age 18 where he currently resides. He was classically trained on the piano from a young age.

Career 
Rosenoer was a touring keyboard player and backup vocalist for Canadian rock band Three Days Grace from 2012 to 2018, playing hundreds of shows internationally.

He recorded piano for the Three Days Grace track "Human Race (Atmosphere Version)" that appears on the second disc of the deluxe edition of the 2015 album, Human.

In 2016, he played keyboards on the album "S.O.A.R." by Devour the Day.

Rosenoer has independently released two full-length albums and several EPs. He released his second full-length album, Monkey Prison, via PledgeMusic in 2016. The album features vocals by Alex Norman (of illScarlett), violin by Dr. Draw and guitar by Andy Wood and Barry Stock (Three Days Grace). The album features two tracks co-produced by Gavin Brown and recorded at Noble Street Studios in Toronto.

He has worked with Grammy award winner David Botrill on the EP Dragonflies in 2009 for Rosenoer's former band Everyone's Talking. The band has toured in Canada and Mexico, was nominated for Best Alternative rock recording at the Toronto Independent Music Awards, going on hiatus in 2011.

Rosenoer won an award at the prime TV special: Fox's Cause for Paws: An All-Star Dog Spectacular for his video "Dog Plays Waltz on Piano".

Discography

References 

1984 births
Living people
Musicians from Moscow
Musicians from Toronto
21st-century Canadian male musicians